Risberg is a Swedish surname, which means "shrub mountain" or "shrub hill", from the Swedish terms ris ("shrub" or "brushwood") and berg ("mountain" or "hill"). Notable people with the surname include:

Annica Risberg (born 1941), Swedish actress and singer
Emilie Risberg (1815–1890), Swedish educator
Jan Risberg (born 1953), Swedish conductor
Lennart Risberg (1935–2013), Swedish boxer
Swede Risberg (1894–1975), American baseball player

Swedish-language surnames